The Bad News Bears Go to Japan (also known as The Bad News Bears 3) is a 1978 American sport comedy film released by Paramount Pictures and was the third and last of a series, following The Bad News Bears and The Bad News Bears in Breaking Training. It stars Tony Curtis and Jackie Earle Haley and features Regis Philbin in a small role and Japanese wrestler Antonio Inoki in a role.

This film was followed by a 1979 CBS-TV series, and by a 2005 remake of the 1976 film.

Plot
Small-time promoter/hustler Marvin Lazar (Curtis) sees a potential money-making venture in the Bears that will help him to pay off his debts. After seeing a TV spot about the Bears, he decides to chaperone the baseball team for a trip to Japan in their game against the country's best little league baseball team.

As implied in Breaking Training, the Bears had to defeat the Houston Toros for a shot at the Japanese champs. In the process, the trip sparks off a series of adventures and mishaps for the boys. A subplot involves the interest of Kelly Leak (Haley) in a local Japanese girl, and the cultural divide that comes to bear in that relationship.

About half of the original or "classic" lineup of Bears players return (many like Jose Agilar, Alfred Ogilvie, Timmy Lupus and Tanner Boyle are not featured). Three new players are featured: E.R.W. Tillyard III, Abe Bernstein and Ahmad's younger brother, Mustapha Rahim.

Cast
 Tony Curtis as Marvin Lazar
 Jackie Earle Haley as  Kelly Leak
 Tomisaburo Wakayama as  Coach Shimizu 
 Antonio Inoki as  Himself 
 Hatsune Ishihara as  Arika 
 George Wyner as  The Network Director 
 Lonny Chapman as  Louis the Gambler 
 Matthew Douglas Anton as  E.R.W. Tillyard III 
 Erin Blunt as  Ahmad Rahim
 George Gonzales as  Miguel Agilar
 Brett Marx as  Jimmy Feldman
 David Pollock as  Rudi Stein
 Jeffrey Louis Starr as  Michael "Mike" Engelberg
 Regis Philbin as Harry Hahn

Reception
The film has a 6% rating on Rotten Tomatoes based on 16 reviews. Jackie Earle Haley considered it the worst movie ever made.

Vincent Canby of The New York Times wrote that "the film is a demonstration of the kind of desperation experienced by people trying to make something out of a voyage to nowhere". Variety noted the "latest version is more successful than the middle outing, but the situation and characters are getting tired". Gene Siskel of the Chicago Tribune gave the film two stars out of four and wrote: "The story this time is much more confused, with plenty of subplots ... what we should be seeing is play-by-play with the kids and some baseball. There is very little of either". Linda Gross of the Los Angeles Times called it "a very good second sequel" and "a wry and entertaining movie". Gary Arnold of The Washington Post wrote: "Every aspect of the premise that might supply a source of comic and melodramatic renewal—the conflicts that arise between kids and parents, the conflicts between kids and other kids, the culture shock of American Little League Baseball confronting its Japanese counterpart—is neglected or shortchanged in favor of lazy self-imitation".

The film opened in 300 theaters in the Southern United States in early June, grossing $910,000 in its opening weekend. In 38 days it had grossed $9 million and went on to earn theatrical rentals of $7.3 million.

Accolades

Home media
The Bad News Bears Go to Japan was released on DVD February 12, 2002 by Paramount, in widescreen only.

See also
 Baseball in Japan

References

External links
 
 

1978 films
1970s sports comedy-drama films
Bad News Bears (franchise)
American baseball films
American sequel films
American sports comedy-drama films
Paramount Pictures films
Films set in Tokyo
Films directed by John Berry
Films scored by Paul Chihara
1978 comedy films
1978 drama films
Japan in non-Japanese culture
1970s English-language films
1970s American films